The 35th World Cup season began in October 2000 in Sölden, Austria, and concluded in March 2001 at the World Cup finals at Åre, Sweden. The overall winners were Hermann Maier of Austria, his third, and Janica Kostelić of Croatia, her first. Maier won 13 races and had nearly twice the points of his nearest competitor, compatriot Stephan Eberharter. In the women's competition, Kostelić won nine races and won the overall by 67 points over Renate Götschl of Austria. There were no North Americans in the top ten of either competition.

A break in the schedule was for the 2001 World Championships, held in St. Anton am Arlberg, Austria, between 29 January and 10 February 2001.

Calendar

Men

Ladies

Men

Overall

Downhill

Super G

Giant slalom

Slalom

Combined

Ladies

Overall

Downhill

Super G

Giant slalom

Slalom

Combined

Footnotes

References

External links
FIS-ski.com – World Cup standings – 2001
de.wikipedia.org – Alpiner Skiweltcup 2001 – 

FIS Alpine Ski World Cup
World Cup
World Cup